Albert Leslie Williams (1 May 1905 – 14 May 1974) was a Welsh professional footballer who played as an outside forward in the Football League for Wrexham, Gillingham and York City, and in non-League football for Chester and Burton Town. He earned one cap for the Wales national team, in a match against England on 22 November 1930.

References

1905 births
1974 deaths
People from Newtown, Powys
Sportspeople from Powys
Welsh footballers
Wales international footballers
Association football forwards
Chester City F.C. players
Wrexham A.F.C. players
Gillingham F.C. players
York City F.C. players
Burton Town F.C. players
English Football League players
Wales amateur international footballers